Perinçek is a Turkish surname. It may refer to:

Doğu Perinçek (born 1942), Turkish politician and lawyer, chairman of the left-wing nationalist Patriotic Party 
Perinçek v. Switzerland, 2013 judgment of the European Court of Human Rights concerning public statements by Doğu Perinçek, who was convicted by a Swiss court for publicly denying the Armenian genocide
Mehmet Perinçek (born 1978), Turkish historian, political scientist, and professor
Sadık Perinçek (1915–2000), deputy Chief Prosecutor of the Supreme Court of Turkey and a parliamentary deputy in the 1950s and 1960s

Turkish-language surnames